Snap general elections were held in Saint Lucia on 30 April 1987, after elections earlier in the month had resulted in only a single-seat majority for the UWP. Despite increasing their share of the vote from 52.5% to 53.2%, the number of seats held by the UWP and the Saint Lucia Labour Party remained the same. Voter turnout was 64.7%.

Results

References

Saint Lucia
1987 II
General
Saint Lucia